Vânători is a commune in Mureș County, Transylvania, Romania. It is composed of five villages: Archita, Feleag, Mureni, Șoard and Vânători. It has a population of 3,760: 47% Romanians, 26% Hungarians, 26% Roma and 1% others.

References

Communes in Mureș County
Localities in Transylvania